The Alan Turing Institute is the United Kingdom's national institute for data science and artificial intelligence, founded in 2015 and largely funded by the UK government. It is named after Alan Turing, the British mathematician and computing pioneer.

Governance
The Alan Turing Institute is an independent private-sector legal entity, operating not-for-profit and as a charity. It is a joint venture among the University of Cambridge, the University of Edinburgh, the University of Oxford, University College London (UCL) and the University of Warwick, selected on the basis of international peer review. In 2018, the institute was joined by eight additional university partners: Queen Mary University of London, University of Leeds, University of Manchester,  University of Newcastle, University of Southampton, University of Birmingham, University of Exeter and University of Bristol.

The Engineering and Physical Sciences Research Council (EPSRC), the primary funder of the institute, is also a member of the joint venture. The primary responsibility for establishing the Alan Turing Institute has been assigned to the EPSRC, with continuing engagement in the shaping of the institute from the Department for Business, Energy and Industrial Strategy (BEIS) and the Government Office for Science. The chair of the Alan Turing Institute, appointed in July 2022, is Doug Gurr; the institute director and chief executive, appointed in 2018, is Sir Adrian Smith.

Funding 
Funding for the creation of the institute came from a £600m investment for the "Eight Great Technologies", and specifically so-called "big data", signalled by the UK Government in 2013 and announced by George Osborne, Chancellor of the Exchequer, in the 2014 budget. The bulk of the investment in "big data" has been directed to computational infrastructure. Of the remainder, £42m was allocated to the institute to cover the initial five-year period of its operation. The five founder universities each contributed £5m to the institute. Further funding has come primarily through grants from Research Councils, university partners and from strategic and other partnerships.

In June 2021, the EPSRC awarded the institute £10 million, on behalf of UK Research and Innovation, for 2021/22.

Location

Concurrently with the selection of founder universities, the EPSRC initiated a process to find a "location partner". The resulting selection of the British Library in London was announced by the Chancellor of the Exchequer in December 2014 during the launch of the Knowledge Quarter, a partnership of organisations in and around the King's Cross area of the capital. 

As of 2023 the Alan Turing Institute is housed within the current British Library building, but it is anticipated it will occupy new premises in a development planned on land between the Francis Crick Institute and library. In February 2023 the plans for the new building were approved by the local council.

Background
The Alan Turing Institute is the indirect product of a letter from the Council for Science and Technology (CST) to the UK prime minister (7 June 2013), describing the "Age of Algorithms". The letter presents a case that "The Government, working with the universities and industry, should create a National Centre to promote advanced research and translational work in algorithms and the application of data science".

The Alan Turing Institute fits into a complex organisational landscape that includes the Open Data Institute, the Digital Catapult and infrastructure investments. The role of the institute is to provide the expertise and fundamental research into data science and artificial intelligence needed to solve real-world problems.

History 
In 2015 Lloyd's Register Foundation became the institute's first strategic partner, providing a grant of £10 million over five years to support research into the engineering applications of big data.

Notable people
 Howard Covington, chair 2015–2022
 Doug Gurr, chair since 2022
 Sir Adrian Smith, director and chief executive since 2018

References

External links

 Theory and Algorithms in Data Science Seminar – a series of talks at the Alan Turing Institute

2015 establishments in the United Kingdom
Educational institutions established in 2015
Organisations based in London
Computer science institutes in the United Kingdom
Mathematical institutes
Statistical organisations in the United Kingdom
Information science
Systems engineering
Proposed buildings and structures in the United Kingdom
Information technology research institutes
British Library
Organisations associated with the University of Cambridge
Organisations associated with the University of Oxford
University of Edinburgh
University College London
University of Warwick
Alan Turing